86th Street Line may refer to the following:
 86th Street Line (Brooklyn)
 M86 (New York City bus), the 86th Street Crosstown Line